Indian Summer is the tenth studio album by the American country rock band Poco, released on May 1, 1977.  The appearance of Steely Dan's Donald Fagen playing synthesizer on two of the tracks marked another move away from the country rock sound the band had primarily been known for. This was the band's last studio album before both Timothy B. Schmit and George Grantham left the group.

Reception

In his Allmusic review, music critic Peter Kurtz wrote the album was "a few notches down from their best, early material. The strongest song is the title track, which has some nice steel guitar and harmony vocals, but this high point is balanced by the closing number, "The Dance," a clumsy suite that's burdened by an over-the-top string and horn arrangement... File this under the "treading water" category."

Track listing
"Indian Summer" (Paul Cotton) – 4:40
"Twenty Years" (Cotton) – 3:42
"Me and You" (Timothy B. Schmit) – 2:44
"Downfall" (Rusty Young) – 4:33
"Win or Lose" (Cotton) – 4:40
"Living in the Band" (Cotton) – 3:14
"Stay (Night Until Noon)" (Timothy B. Schmit, Noreen Schmit) – 3:22
"Find Out in Time" (Timothy B. Schmit, Robbin Thompson) – 3:54
"The Dance: When the Dance Is Over / Go on and Dance / Never Gonna Stop / When the Dance Is Over (Reprise)" (Young) – 10:05

Charts

Track-by-track personnel
"Indian Summer"
 Paul Cotton – lead vocals, Gretsch White Falcon
 Timothy B. Schmit – backing vocals, bass
 George Grantham – backing vocals, drums
 Rusty Young – steel and sitar steel guitars
 Steve Forman – percussion, creatures
 Donald Fagen – ARP Odyssey, ARP String Ensemble
"Twenty Years"
 Paul Cotton – lead vocals, lead guitar
 George Grantham – drums
 Timothy B. Schmit – backing vocals, bass
 Rusty Young – steel and lead steel guitars
 Mark Henry Herman – acoustic piano
 Steve Forman – tambourine
"Me and You"
 Timothy B. Schmit – lead vocals, bass
 George Grantham – backing vocals, drums
 Paul Cotton – backing vocals, acoustic and electric guitars
 Rusty Young – steel guitar
"Downfall"
 Rusty Young – lead vocals, Leslie and lead steel guitar, electric guitar
 George Grantham – backing vocals, drums
 Timothy B. Schmit – backing vocals, bass
 Paul Cotton – lead guitar
 Mark Henry Herman – acoustic piano
 Steve Forman – congas, tambourine
"Win or Lose"
 Paul Cotton – lead vocals, Gretsch White Falcon
 George Grantham – backing vocals, drums
 Timothy B. Schmit – backing vocals, bass
 Rusty Young – Leslie and wah-wah steel guitars
 Donald Fagen – ARP String Ensemble
"Living in the Band"
 Paul Cotton – lead vocals, lead guitar
 George Grantham – backing vocals, drums, jawbone, shakers
 Timothy B. Schmit – backing vocals, bass
 Rusty Young – Leslie and lead steel guitars
 Steve Forman – congas
"Stay (Night Until Noon)"
 Timothy B. Schmit – lead vocals, bass
 Paul Cotton – backing vocals, lead guitar
 George Grantham – backing vocals, drums
 Rusty Young – Leslie steel guitar, banjo
"Find Out in Time"
 Timothy B. Schmit – lead vocals, bass, harmonica
 George Grantham – backing vocals, shakers
 Paul Cotton – backing vocals, acoustic and electric guitars
 Rusty Young – Leslie steel guitar, mandolin, banjo
 Steve Forman — surdo
"The Dance"
 Rusty Young –acoustic, slide, electric and Leslie steel guitars
 George Grantham – lead and backing vocals, drums
 Paul Cotton – lead and backing vocals, Gretsch White Falcon
 Timothy B. Schmit – lead and backing vocals, bass, harmonica
 Mark Henry Herman – electric piano, celesta
 Steve Forman – percussion
 Sid Sharp – concertmaster
 Jimmie Haskell – string and horn arrangements

Production 
 Poco – producers
 Mark Henry Harman – producer, engineer 
 Tim "Zoots" Green – assistant engineer 
 Wally Traugott – mastering 
 Capitol Studios (Hollywood, California) – mastering location 
 Llew Llewellyn – equipment 
 Terry Merchant – equipment
 Phil Hartman – cover artwork 
 Ron Slenzak – photography 
 Dennis Jones – road manager 
 Hartmann & Goodman – management

References

Poco albums
1977 albums
ABC Records albums